Ostenfeld may refer to:

Ostenfeld, Nordfriesland, a municipality in Schleswig-Holstein, Germany
Ostenfeld, Rendsburg-Eckernförde, a municipality in Schleswig-Holstein, Germany
Asger Skovgaard Ostenfeld, a Danish civil engineer
Carl Hansen Ostenfeld, a Danish botanist